Gar Nasimpur is a popular Bengali film directed by Ajit Lahiri. Barindranath Das wrote the screenplay and story in this movie. The film was released under the banner of Shadow Productions in 1968 and was directed by Shyamal Mitra. The film stars Uttam Kumar, Biswajit Chatterjee, Madhavi Mukherjee, Ruma Guhathakurta.

Synopsis
The story is set in 1751 when Shahjahan was the emperor and Prince Shuja was the subedar of Bengal. But many conspired to become kings. Meanwhile, Prince Aurangzeb has met the King of Golconda. Shuja especially liked Raja Indranarayana of Nasimpur but as a conspirator he occupied the territory of his very close friend Umakanta Roy. Devkant Roy's son Umakanta is still with Indranarayana. One day he met Bhujang Haldar, the leader of a band of robbers. His dewan forbade Basudev to meet Uttara, the princess of Nasimpur. But Uttara loves Basudev, she tells him that his activities are not acceptable to her. Eventually Mir Jumla helped Prince Aurangzeb and Basudev conspired with Mir Jumla. But Umakanta exposes all the conspiracies and then reunites with Uttara.

Cast 
 Uttam Kumar
 Biswajit Chatterjee
 Madhabi Mukherjee
 Dev Mukherjee
 Asitavaran
 Vanu Banerjee
 Bikash Roy
 Ruma Guha Thakurata
 Anup Kumar
 Tarun Kumar
 Kamal Mitra
 Preeti Majumdar
 Ardhendu Bhattacharya
 Shambhu Bhattacharya
 Vanu Chatterjee
 Pankaj Chatterjee
 Shekhar Chatterjee
 Subrata Chatterjee
 Krishnakali Mandal
 Malay Mukherjee
 Padmadevi
 Master Prasoon
 Dilip Roy
 Good government
 Subrata Sensharma
 Master Shantanu

Soundtrack

References

External links 
 

1968 films
Bengali-language Indian films
1960s Bengali-language films
Films scored by Shyamal Mitra